Pascal Mahé (born 15 December 1963, in Caen) is a French handball player. He competed in the 1992 Summer Olympics and in the 1996 Summer Olympics.

Career
In 1992, Mahé was a member of the French handball team that won the bronze medal. He played six matches and scored twelve goals.

Four years later, Mahé finished fourth with the French team in the 1996 Olympic tournament. He played four matches and scored two goals.

External links
profile

1963 births
Living people
French male handball players
Olympic handball players of France
Handball players at the 1992 Summer Olympics
Handball players at the 1996 Summer Olympics
Olympic bronze medalists for France
Olympic medalists in handball
Sportspeople from Caen
Medalists at the 1992 Summer Olympics